Joyce Elena Oladapo (married name Hepher; born 11 February 1964) is a female retired English long jumper.

Athletics career
In 1984, she jumped the qualifying distance required to compete at the 1984 Summer Olympics, however she achieved this two days after the British athletics team had been submitted to the International Olympic Committee, and was thus unable to be selected: she instead competed in the long jump at the Friendship Games in Prague, which were held as an event for sportspeople from Communist countries who were boycotting that year's Olympics.

Oladapo represented England and won a gold medal in the long jump event, at the 1986 Commonwealth Games in Edinburgh, Scotland.

She was born in London.

International competitions

References

1964 births
Living people
Athletes from London
British female long jumpers
English female long jumpers
Commonwealth Games gold medallists for England
Commonwealth Games medallists in athletics
Athletes (track and field) at the 1986 Commonwealth Games
Black British sportswomen
Medallists at the 1986 Commonwealth Games